Lentisphera araneosa is a marine bacteria strain in the bacterial phylum Lentisphaerota. They are able to produce viscous transparent exopolymers and grow attached to each other by the polymer in a three-dimensional configuration.  They are part of the natural surface bacterial population in the Atlantic and Pacific oceans. They are less than 1% of the total bacterial community.  This species is gram negative, non-motile, non-pigmented, aerobic, chemoheterotrophic, and facultatively oligotrophic sphere-shaped. Its genome has been sequenced.

References

Further reading

External links
Type strain of Lentisphaera araneosa at BacDive -  the Bacterial Diversity Metadatabase

Lentisphaerota
Marine biology
Bacteria described in 2004